Marvel's Spider-Man: Miles Morales is a 2020 action-adventure video game developed by Insomniac Games and published by Sony Interactive Entertainment. Based on the Marvel Comics character Miles Morales, it is inspired by both the character's decade-long comic book mythology and the 2018 animated film Spider-Man: Into the Spider-Verse, which helped popularize him. The game is a spin-off sequel to Marvel's Spider-Man (2018), and the second installment in Insomniac's Spider-Man series. The narrative focuses on Miles' struggle to balance the duties of his civilian persona and his role as the second Spider-Man when his new home, Harlem, is threatened by a war between the Roxxon Energy Corporation and a high-tech criminal army called the Underground, led by the mysterious Tinkerer.

Gameplay is presented from the third-person perspective with a primary focus on Miles' traversal and combat abilities. Miles can freely move around New York City, interacting with characters, undertaking missions, and unlocking new gadgets and suits by progressing through the main story or completing tasks. Outside the story, the player is able to complete side missions to unlock additional content and collectible items. Combat focuses on chaining attacks together and using the environment and webs to incapacitate numerous foes while avoiding damage.

Announced at the PlayStation 5 reveal event in June 2020, the game was released as a launch title for the new console on November 12, 2020, in North America and Australia, and November 19 worldwide. A PlayStation 4 version was released the same day, lacking some of the advanced features of its next-gen counterpart such as ray-tracing or a 60 FPS performance mode, because of the console's technical limitations. A Windows version was released on November 18, 2022. The game received praise for its combat, narrative, content, and technical improvements of the PlayStation 5 version. It sold over 6.5 million units by July 2021.

Gameplay

The core gameplay of Marvel's Spider-Man: Miles Morales is the same of its predecessor. It features the same open world, a fictionalized version of modern-day Manhattan, which is covered in snow because the game is set during the holidays. Miles controls similarly to Peter Parker, but with new animations and abilities, which are unlocked as the storyline progresses. The new powers include Venom Blast, which allows the player to incapacitate enemies with bio-electricity, and charge or drain electronics; Camouflage, which gives Miles temporary invisibility; and Mega Venom Blast, consisting of a massive explosion of bio-electricity that damages all nearby enemies. The game introduces new gadgets, such as Remote Mines, which can attach to enemies or electrical panels; a device that summons holographic fighters to help in combat; and Gravity Wells that trap multiple enemies and make them easier to hit. Miles' abilities and gadgets can be upgraded as the player levels up via a skill tree system. Another feature that the game offers is Miles' Spider-Man app which gives him feedback on crimes happening in New York City and the location of these crimes. It informs the player of any side missions that are available for them to complete, which is beneficial to level up.

Miles possesses a "spider sense", which warns the player of incoming attacks and allows them to dodge and retaliate, and web-shooters, which fire lines of webs that can be used during both traversal and combat, in several different ways. Miles can also jump large distances, stick to surfaces, and fast travel using the New York City Subway system. There several unlockable suits for Miles, some of which are based on existing versions of the character in media, as well as original suits created for the game. Many of these enhance Miles' abilities, such as allowing him to take more damage, stay invisible for a longer time, or regenerate Venom Power faster. During certain sections of the game, players control Miles in his civilian persona and cannot use any of his abilities or gadgets.

Synopsis

Characters and setting
The narrative continues from where Marvel's Spider-Man and its downloadable content The City That Never Sleeps left off, during which Miles Morales (Nadji Jeter) was bitten by a genetically enhanced spider and gained powers similar to his mentor Peter Parker (Yuri Lowenthal). A year after the first game's conclusion, Miles has been trained by Parker, moved from Brooklyn to Harlem, and has fully integrated himself into the role of a Spider-Man. He is still in the process of gaining experience and doubts whether he can live up to Parker's legacy. At the beginning of the game, Parker leaves New York for Symkaria for several weeks to help his girlfriend Mary Jane Watson with her reporting there and trusts Miles to protect the city in his absence. Now the sole Spider-Man, Miles must balance his new superhero responsibilities with supporting his mother Rio Morales (Jacqueline Piñol) in her campaign for City Council and defending his new home from a violent war between the corrupt Roxxon Energy Corporation and a high-tech criminal army known as the Underground.

The game features both new and returning supporting characters, including the supervillain Rhino (Fred Tatasciore), the imprisoned crime lord Kingpin (Travis Willingham), anti-Spider-Man podcaster J. Jonah Jameson (Darin De Paul), and F.E.A.S.T. volunteer Gloria Davila (Melanie Minichino). Parker's former mentor and employer Dr. Otto Octavius (William Salyers) appears in a flashback, while the head of Oscorp and former New York mayor Norman Osborn (Mark Rolston) appears in a mid-credits scene. Miles' late father, Officer Jefferson Davis (Russell Richardson), appears in a voice-only role as part of a side-quest. 

The new cast includes Miles' best friend and schoolmate Ganke Lee (Griffin Puatu), who assists him with his Spider-Man activities; Miles' estranged and overprotective uncle Aaron Davis (Ike Amadi), who operates as an armored mercenary known as the Prowler; podcaster and Spider-Man supporter Danika Hart (Ashly Burch); deaf street artist Hailey Cooper (Natasha Ofili); bodega owner Teo Alvarez (Yancey Arias); Caleb's Clean Cuts barber Caleb Ward (Emerson Brooks); Pana Fuerte restaurateur Camila Vasquez (Krizia Bajos); head of Roxxon's R&D department Simon Krieger (Troy Baker); and Miles' childhood best friend Phin Mason (Jasmin Savoy Brown), who seeks to avenge the death of her brother and Miles' other friend Rick (Todd Williams) as the mysterious Tinkerer.

Plot
After more than a year of training under Peter Parker, Miles Morales has mastered his spider-like abilities and established himself as the original Spider-Man's crime-fighting partner, though he still struggles to adapt into his new role. While escorting a police convoy carrying prisoners to the rebuilt Raft, Miles accidentally frees Rhino, who wreaks havoc across the city. While Miles stops the other escapees, Peter struggles against Rhino, who eventually overpowers him. Before Rhino can kill Peter, Miles intervenes and defeats him with his new bio-electric ability, later dubbed "Venom Power". Leaving Rhino in Roxxon's custody, Peter informs Miles that he will be assisting his girlfriend, Daily Bugle reporter Mary Jane Watson, with her assignment in Symkaria for a few weeks as her photographer, and entrusts him to look after the city in his absence, despite Miles' low-confidence due to having messed up earlier.

While investigating a break-in at the Roxxon Plaza, Miles clashes with a group called the Underground, who have a vendetta against the company. Returning home to celebrate Christmas with his mother Rio and friend Ganke Lee, Miles is surprised to learn that Rio invited Phin Mason, with whom he has not spoken in over a year. The next day, Ganke creates a Spider-Man app so citizens can call Miles for help directly. Miles's uncle, Aaron Davis, is the first to use it and reveals his knowledge of his nephew's identity. Miles attends one of Rio's campaign rallies, but witnesses the Underground attacking the Roxxon guards present and tries to stop the conflict before it escalates. He discovers that the Underground are seeking Roxxon's experimental power source, Nuform, and that Phin is their leader, the Tinkerer. After further investigation, Miles learns that Phin wants to avenge the death of her brother Rick Mason. The latter was poisoned by Nuform's toxic properties and killed by Simon Krieger after attempting to sabotage the project. With assistance from Aaron, whom he learns is the mercenary known as the Prowler, Miles discovers Phin's plan to ruin Roxxon by destroying their plaza with Nuform to highlight its dangerous side effects, which Krieger had been covering up.

After betraying Phin's trust to gather information on the Underground, Miles is forced to reveal his identity to her, souring their friendship. Miles tries to reconcile with Phin, but Roxxon abducts them with the aid of an enhanced Rhino. Miles and Phin escape, but Miles learns that Aaron has been spying on him for Roxxon and that Krieger modified the plaza's Nuform reactor to destroy Harlem if Phin's plan succeeds. Phin and Miles fight the enhanced Rhino, who taunts Phin about Rick's death. She almost kills him, but Miles intervenes, and the two fight before Phin knocks Miles out and escapes. Ganke brings an injured Miles home, where Rio discovers her son's identity and continues to support him. Once he recovers, Miles tries to stop Phin. However, he is captured by Aaron, who takes him underground to prevent him from being killed like his father Jefferson Davis, whom he was unable to reconcile with prior to his death, which resulted in his overprotectiveness over Miles. Miles escapes and defeats his uncle, explaining that he cannot turn his back on people when they need him.

While the Underground and Roxxon fight on the streets and Phin executes her plan, Aaron, inspired by his nephew's words, helps Rio evacuate Harlem, giving Miles a chance to confront Phin and stop the Nuform reactor before it goes critical. Unable to reason with her, Miles fights Phin before attempting to absorb the Nuform to negate the blast. However, there is too much energy, and Miles is unable to contain it, slowly killing him. To save the city and realizing the error of her ways, Phin sacrifices herself by flying Miles to a safe distance above the city so that he can release the energy before it kills him. Miles plummets to the ground, revealing his identity to a small number of citizens he helped as Spider-Man, who promise to keep his secret and hail him as a hero. Four weeks later, Roxxon has been dealt numerous lawsuits, and Krieger has been arrested following Aaron turning himself in and testifying against them. Peter returns from Symkaria and praises Miles for his growth and heroism before they head off to fight crime together.

In a mid-credits scene, Oscorp CEO and former New York Mayor Norman Osborn orders a reluctant Dr. Curt Connors to release his terminally ill son Harry from stasis despite his unstable condition. In a post-credits scene, Miles leaves an award he won with Phin atop Trinity Church in her memory.

Events after the main story ends with Miles being enlisted by his mother for a scavenger hunt across Manhattan to find postcards which contains voice messages by his late father, Jefferson within each USB drives. The last scavenger hunt ends at Harlem's outdoor basketball field, where Miles recalls his time playing a basketball game with his parents and uncle Aaron, including Phin during his middle school life.

Development
Marvel's Spider-Man: Miles Morales was developed by Insomniac Games and published by Sony Interactive Entertainment for the PlayStation 4 and PlayStation 5. Sony vice president Simon Rutter told The Telegraph that the game is "an expansion and an enhancement to the previous game". However, Insomniac later called the project a standalone game, stating that it is "the next adventure in the Marvel's Spider-Man universe". It is smaller in size and scope than Spider-Man, and has been compared to Uncharted: The Lost Legacy, a game which served as a standalone expansion that was smaller in size and scope than a mainline Uncharted title.

The game features "a new story, with new set-pieces, fresh villains, and unique quests". For the PlayStation 5 version, the game takes advantage of the console's increased processing power, dedicated ray-tracing hardware, custom solid-state drive storage, Tempest Engine and DualSense controller to support features such as advanced haptic feedback, real-time ray tracing effects, 3D spatial audio and reduced loading times. The PlayStation 5 version of Marvel's Spider-Man: Miles Morales supports high dynamic range and an optional "performance mode" that allows the game to run at 4K resolution and 60 frames per second.

On October 9, 2020, Insomniac Games announced via Twitter that the game had "gone gold", meaning that physical copies of the game were ready to be produced, with any further development being patched into the game through software updates.

After the release on Playstation 4 and Playstation 5, the studio ported the game to PC via Steam and the Epic Games Store on November 18, 2022.

Music
John Paesano returned to compose the musical score for Marvel's Spider-Man: Miles Morales after composing 2018's Spider-Man. Unlike the 2018 game's music which was more orchestral-based, Miles Morales soundtrack mixes orchestral themes with hip hop music. Three original songs were created for the soundtrack: "I'm Ready" by Jaden Smith, and "Where We Come From" and "This Is My Time" by Lecrae.

Marketing

Tie-in media and merchandise 
On October 7, 2020, Marvel Games revealed a prequel novel, Marvel's Spider-Man: Miles Morales – Wings of Fury, which was published on November 10, 2020, and written by Brittney Morris. The novel follows Miles coming to terms with what it means to be Spider-Man. He is left questioning everything when Vulture and his accomplice Starling release experimental tech onto New York City. Also announced was Marvel's Spider-Man: Miles Morales – The Art of the Game by Matt Ralphs, which was released on February 16, 2021. It features a collection of concept art, in-game renderings, and insights from the artists and Insomniac Games.

In March 2021, Funko Pop! Vinyl figures of the Classic and T.R.A.C.K. suits from the game, were released, with the latter of the two having a limited edition chase variant in which Miles is unmasked. A further selection of the 2020, Bodega Cat, S.T.R.I.K.E, Advanced Tech, Purple Rein, Crimson Cowl, Winter and Programmable Matter suits were released in April 2021, with the last two having exclusive variants available at Hot Topic and GameStop respectively.

Release
The game was announced on June 11, 2020, at the PlayStation 5 reveal event as a launch title. It released worldwide on November 12, 2020, for PlayStation 4, with the PlayStation 5 version also releasing in North America, Australia and New Zealand on that date; a week later, it released worldwide for the PlayStation 5. The game is available in numerous editions. The standard edition includes the base game and is available for both consoles, with the PlayStation 4 version supporting a free upgrade to the PlayStation 5 version. The Ultimate Edition is available for the PlayStation 5, bundling together the base game and Marvel's Spider-Man Remastered. Launch variants of all editions were available in North America, and these variants feature instant access to the following; the T.R.A.C.K. suit and Miles' suit from the 2018 animated film Spider-Man: Into the Spider-Verse, three extra skill points and a Gravity Well Gadget. International retailers delivered this content separately as a redeemable code. All of these bonus items are available throughout the course of the game to those who did not receive the pre-order bonuses.

The standalone game features a dedication to the original actor for the Marvel Cinematic Universe's Black Panther, Chadwick Boseman, who died two months before the game's release. An enhanced version of Miles Morales (featuring a variety of graphical options, unlocked framerates, ultrawide monitor support, and support for other technologies such as Nvidia's DLSS 3 and Reflex, as well as AMD's FidelityFX Super Resolution (FSR) 2.1 and Intel's XeSS) was released on Windows in November 2022 on Steam and the Epic Games Store. The port is developed by PlayStation studio Nixxes Software.

Reception 

Marvel's Spider-Man: Miles Morales received "generally favorable reviews", according to review aggregator Metacritic. 

Jonathon Dornbush of IGN enjoyed the new PS5 enhancements of the game and the more compelling side content. Destructoids Chris Carter praised the game's story and Miles' new abilities. Andrew Reiner of Game Informer appreciated the improvements to combat and the area of Harlem.

Sales 
The PlayStation 4 version of Marvel's Spider-Man: Miles Morales sold 22,882 physical copies within its first week on sale in Japan, making it the eighth-best-selling retail game of the week in the country. During the same week, the PlayStation 5 version was the tenth-best-selling retail game in Japan, selling 18,640 physical copies. Miles Morales was also the best-selling physical PlayStation 5 launch game in the UK. In Germany, the game sold over 100,000 copies in its launch month and 200,000 copies by the end of December 2020. As of December 18, 2020, the game has sold a combined total of 663,000 digital copies across both the PlayStation 4 and PlayStation 5 platforms. On April 22, 2021, Jeff Grubb of VentureBeat reported that the game had outsold both The Last of Us Part II and Ghost of Tsushima with regards to lifetime sales. As of July 18, 2021, the game had sold over 6.5 million copies. Miles Morales was the twelfth best-selling game of 2020, and the sixth best-selling game of 2021.

Accolades

Notes

References

2020 video games
Action-adventure games
Annie Award winners
BAFTA winners (video games)
Insomniac Games games
Marvel's Spider-Man
Open-world video games
PlayStation 4 games
PlayStation 5 games
Single-player video games
Sony Interactive Entertainment games
Superhero video games
Video game sequels
Video games based on Spider-Man
Video games developed in the United States
Video games featuring black protagonists
Video games set in New York City
Video games set in 2019
Windows games
Nixxes Software games